Kineh Vars (also Romanized as Kīneh Vars; also known as Kinavaris and Kīneh Varz) is a village in Abharrud Rural District, in the Central District of Abhar County, Zanjan Province, Iran. At the 2006 census, its population was 703, in 184 families.

Language 
They are speak Azerbaijani language and their religion is Shia Islam (Twelver)

References 

Populated places in Abhar County